The 1995 Ohio Bobcats football team was an American football team that represented Ohio University in the Mid-American Conference (MAC) during the 1995 NCAA Division I-A football season. In their first season under head coach Jim Grobe, the Bobcats compiled a 2–8–1 record (1–6–1 against MAC opponents), finished in ninth place in the MAC, and were outscored by all opponents by a combined total of 320 to 161.  They played their home games in Peden Stadium in Athens, Ohio.

Schedule

References

Ohio
Ohio Bobcats football seasons
Ohio Bobcats football